The 2020 Gamba Osaka season was Gamba Osaka's 27th season in the J1 League and 33rd overall in the Japanese top flight. It will see them compete in the 18 team J1 League as well as the J.League Cup and Emperor's Cup competitions.

Pre-season friendlies

Transfers

Coaching Staff

First team squad
As of 23 February 2020.

J1 League

Results summary

Results by round

League table

Results

Emperor's Cup

J.League Cup

Squad statistics

Goal scorers 
The list is sorted by shirt number when total goals are equal.

Gamba Osaka U-23

U-23 Squad statistics

References

Gamba Osaka
Gamba Osaka seasons